The 1994 Monaco Grand Prix was a Formula One motor race held on 15 May 1994 at the Circuit de Monaco, Monte Carlo. It was the fourth race of the 1994 Formula One World Championship, and the first following the deaths of Ayrton Senna and Roland Ratzenberger at the San Marino Grand Prix two weeks previously.

The 78-lap race was won from pole position by Michael Schumacher driving a Benetton-Ford, his fourth victory from the first four races of 1994. Martin Brundle finished second in a McLaren-Peugeot, with Gerhard Berger third in a Ferrari.

Report

Background
After the deaths of Ayrton Senna and Roland Ratzenberger at the San Marino Grand Prix, sweeping changes were announced by the FIA to the rules and regulations of Formula One in a bid to improve safety. The majority were scheduled to come into force after the Monaco Grand Prix, but an 80 km/h pit-lane speed limit was brought into force in time for this race.

Both Williams and Simtek, the teams for whom Senna and Ratzenberger drove, ran only one car each during the race weekend.

Eddie Irvine was serving the third race of his three-race ban issued to him for his part in the crash during the Brazilian Grand Prix. Andrea de Cesaris again took Irvine's place at Jordan, whilst Irvine acted as a pit-lane reporter for the ESPN television station.

Olivier Beretta became the first Monégasque to compete in the Monaco Grand Prix since André Testut in 1959. This was the last time a driver from Monaco competed in his home race, until Charles Leclerc took part in the 2018 race.

Practice and qualifying
During the first free practice session on Thursday morning, Austrian driver Karl Wendlinger had a major accident at the Nouvelle Chicane. Travelling at almost  he appeared to brake too late, and the car slid sideways into the water-filled barriers. Wendlinger was knocked unconscious and was taken initially to the Princess Grace Hospital, and later to Saint Roch Hospital in Nice. He suffered a serious head injury and remained in a coma for several weeks. The Sauber-Mercedes team decided to withdraw from the race after this incident.

Michael Schumacher claimed the first pole position of his Grand Prix career. Mika Häkkinen qualified second, which was also the highest starting position thus far in his career. Martin Brundle qualified 2nd in the first qualifying session on the Thursday, three tenths of a second in front of team mate Mika Häkkinen, but could not repeat this on the Saturday and dropped to 8th.

Race

As a mark of respect for Senna and Ratzenberger, the FIA decided to leave the first two grid positions empty for the race and painted them with the colours of the Brazilian and Austrian flags. For the first time since the 1959 United States Grand Prix, there was no previous World Champion competing in the race and also no former Monaco Grand Prix winner. There were also only four previous race winners: Schumacher, Hill, Berger and Alboreto.

At the start of the race, Damon Hill clipped the left rear tyre of Mika Häkkinen's McLaren just before the St. Devote corner. Häkkinen retired immediately, while Hill continued for a few corners before retiring with broken right front suspension. Gianni Morbidelli and Pierluigi Martini also collided before St. Devote, putting each other out. Eric Bernard in the second Ligier had soon spun out of the race at the Nouvelle chicane. 

Katayama retired his Tyrrell from 6th position on lap 39 when his gearbox failed, as of which by lap 41, the engine on Mark Blundell's Tyrrell failed, leaving oil on the track at St. Devote retiring 2 laps after Katayama which Schumacher, leading the race, had to avoid. The second placed Ferrari of Gerhard Berger did slip on the oil, however, and required a three-point turn to escape from the run off area beside the stricken Tyrrell. Berger returned to the track still in his second place, but dirty tyres left him vulnerable to the McLaren of Martin Brundle, who promptly overtook him down the outside of Mirabeau on the same lap. Christian Fittipaldi in his Footwork-Ford ran close behind the Ferraris of Berger and Alesi in fourth position until his first refuelling stop near the start of the race. Fittipaldi continued to run strongly in a points position until lap 47 when the gearbox failed.

The race was led from start to finish by Schumacher, who continued his perfect start to the 1994 season with four victories in the first four races. As Schumacher also held the fastest lap, this meant he scored the first Grand Slam of his career, and he was the first driver other than Alain Prost or Ayrton Senna to win the Monaco Grand Prix since 1983. Brundle's second place equalled the best finish of his F1 career. Michele Alboreto finished sixth in his Minardi to score his final point in F1.

Post-race

Classification

Qualifying

Race

Championship standings after the race

Drivers' Championship standings

Constructors' Championship standings

References

Monaco Grand Prix
Monaco Grand Prix
Grand Prix
Monaco Grand Prix